The Ghana Billie Jean King Cup team represents Ghana in Billie Jean King Cup tennis competition and are governed by the Ghana Tennis Federation.  They currently compete in the Europe/Africa Zone of Group III.

History
Ghana competed in its first Billie Jean King Cup in 2021.  Their best result was finishing fourth in their Group III pool in 2021.

Team (2021)
Annette Cruickshank
Naa Anyema Mckorley
Naa Shika Mckorley
Nyanyuie Grace Tomegah

See also
Billie Jean King Cup
Ghana Davis Cup team

External links

Billie Jean King Cup teams
Billie Jean King Cup
Billie Jean King Cup